Wilson's model of information seeking behaviour was born out of a need to focus the field of information and library science on human use of information, rather than the use of sources.

Previous studies undertaken in the field were primarily concerned with systems, specifically, how an individual uses a system. Very little had been written that examined an individual's information needs, or how information seeking behaviour related to other task-oriented behaviours.

Thomas D. Wilson's first model came from a presentation at the University of Maryland in 1971 when "an attempt was made to map the processes involved in what was known at the time as "user need research".

Wilson's first model
Published in 1981, Wilson's first model outlined the factors leading to information seeking, and the barriers inhibiting action. It stated that information-seeking was prompted by an individual's physiological, cognitive, or affective needs, which have their roots in personal factors, role demands, or environmental context. 

In order to satisfy these needs, an individual makes demands upon various information systems such as the library and the use of technology. The user may also contact an intermediary such as family, friends and colleagues. The information provided by  any of the contacted sources is then evaluated to determine if it satisfies the individual's needs. This first model was based on an understanding of human information-seeking behaviors that are best understood as three interwoven frameworks: The user, the information system, and the information resource.

First revision in 1994
Wilson later built upon his original model in order to understand the personal circumstance, social role, and environmental context in which an information need is created. This new model, altered in 1994 incorporated Ellis' stages of information-seeking: starting, browsing, differentiating, monitoring, extracting, verifying and ending.

The new model It also displayed the physiological, affective, and cognitive needs that give rise to information seeking behaviour. The model recognized that an information need is not a need in and of itself, but rather one that stems from a previous psychological need. These needs are generated by the interplay of personal habits and political, economic, and technological factors in an individual's environmental. The factors that drive needs can also obstruct an individual's search for information.

Second revision in 1997
In 1997 Wilson proposed a third, general model that built upon the previous two. This model incorporated several new elements that helped to demonstrate the stages experienced by the 'person in context', or searcher, when looking for information. These included an intermediate stage between the acknowledgement of a need and the initiation of action, a redefining of the barriers he proposed in his second model as "intervening variables" to show that factors can be supportive or preventative a feedback loop, and an "activating mechanism" stage. 

'Activating mechanisms' identify relevant impetus that prompt a decision to seek information, and integrate behavioural theories such as 'stress/coping theory', 'risk/reward theory' and 'social learning theory'.

Nested model
In 1999, Wilson developed a nested model that brought together different areas of research in the study of information behavior. The model represented research topics as a series of nested fields, with information behavior as the general area of investigation, information-seeking behavior as its sub-set, and information searching behavior as a further sub-set.

An evolving model
Wilson's model has changed over time, and will continue to evolve as technology and the nature of information changes. The model has been cited and discussed by leaders in the information science field, and can be integrated with other significant theories of information behaviour. Wilson describes the model diagrams as elaborating on one another, saying "no one model stands alone and in using the model to guide the development of research ideas, it is necessary to examine and reflect upon all of the diagrams".

Recently, there has been a shift from theorizing on research already conducted on information behaviour, to pursuing "research within specific theoretical contexts". Wilson's Model is "aimed at linking theories to action"; however, it is this move from theory to action that is proving slow. Through numerous qualitative studies, "we now have many in depth investigations into the information seeking behavior of small samples of people". Despite these studies, there have not been many links made between this research and changes in policy or practice.

References

Sources 

Bawden, D. (2006). Users, user studies and human information behaviour: a three decade perspective on Tom Wilson's "On user studies and information needs". Journal of Documentation, 62(6), 671-179.
Case, D. O. (2012). Looking for information: A survey of research on information seeking, needs, and behavior (3rd ed.). Bingley, UK: Emerald Group Publishing Limited.
Wilson, T. D. (1981). On user studies and information needs. Journal of Documentation, 37(1), 3-15.
Wilson, T. D. (1994). Information needs and uses: fifty years of progress? In B. C. Vickory (Ed.), Fifty years of information progress: A Journal of Documentation review (pp. 15–51). London: Aslib.
Wilson, T. D. (1997). Information behaviour: an interdisciplinary perspective. Information Processing and Management, 33(4), 551-572.
Wilson, T. D. (1999). Models of information behaviour research. Journal of Documentation, 55(3), 249-270.
Wilson, T. D. (2000). Human information behavior. Informing Science, 3(2), 49-55.
Wilson, T. D. (2005). Evolution in information behaviour modeling: Wilson's model. In K. Fisher, S. Erdelez, & L. McKechnie (Eds.), Theories of information behavior (pp. 31–39). Medford, New Jersey: Information Today.
Wilson, T.D. (2010). Fifty Years of Information Behaviour Research. Bulletin, 36(3), 27-34.

Information theory